YNU may refer to:

 Yokohama National University
 Yorkshire Naturalists' Union
 Yunnan University